Watersipora is a genus of bryozoans belonging to the family Watersiporidae.

The genus has cosmopolitan distribution.

Species:

Watersipora arcuata 
Watersipora aterrima 
Watersipora atrofusca 
Watersipora bidentata 
Watersipora cucullata 
Watersipora erecta 
Watersipora faragii 
Watersipora grandis 
Watersipora hanzawae 
Watersipora mawatarii 
Watersipora nigra 
Watersipora platypora 
Watersipora souleorum 
Watersipora subatra 
Watersipora subtorquata 
Watersipora watersi

References

Bryozoan genera